Paulina Alejandra Del Moral Vela (born August 22, 1983 in Cuautitlan Izcalli, State of Mexico) is the Deputy Federal District VII in Cuautitlan Izcalli for the period September 1, 2012 - August 31, 2015. She was the Mayor of Cuautitlán Izcalli between 2009 and 2012. She Was nominated by the Provincial Local District 43 in 2006. She graduated in Law from the Universidad Iberoamericana and earned a master's degree in Public Administration and Public Policy from the Instituto Tecnologico y de Estudios Superiores de Monterrey.

Political career
Her interest in law and her passion for politics, pushed for that, at 16 years old, decided to enter the Institutional Revolutionary Party, because, as she says: "The PRI is the only party that really promotes political stability and social peace in Mexico and the only one working to realize the principle of social justice, for the welfare of all. "
From the start, stood out as a militant dynamic, supportive and committed; characteristics that led to occupy important responsibilities within the PRI since 1999, among which are: Technical Secretary of the Political Council Municipal Representative on route campaign for Governor Enrique Peña Nieto, candidate for Congress District 43 of Cuautitlan Izcalli Local, state leader in the State of Mexico and Young Women's National Policy Advisor.
During the administration of Governor Enrique Peña Nieto and the State of Mexico, was Director of International Relations of the state government.
In 2009, obtained the PRI candidacy for municipal president of Cuautitlan Izcalli; achieving public support in the polls and recovered for the PRI mayor after 12 years, thus became the youngest Municipal President of the country and first woman to hold that office in the town and the first mayor native of Cuautitlan Izcalli.

Municipal President 2009-2012
From the beginning, the government was able to get ahead of a debt inherited from past administrations, which reached 2 billion dollars and jeopardized the operation of the council. After debugging resources, met the improvement of public services such as lighting, street paving, garbage collection, the recovery of public spaces such as parks and gardens, among others.
Also launched the first generation of social programs to 100 percent municipal resources, among which the delivery of school, student scholarships, and loans to support women entrepreneurs. We also walked the "A Work or School Action", to dignify all basic education schools in the municipality, also managed to manage the installation of the UAEM campus, which today serves hundreds of young izcallenses in 4 degrees, among other achievements of government.

Candidacy for County Council VII of the Federal District
On February 7, 2012 she visited the headquarters of the PRI state to deliver the documents and receiving evidence credited as the PRI's candidate. Then get the record for most as Candidate Cuautitlan Izcalli District VII.
Federal Provincial (September 1, 2012 -) On July 8, 2012 she receives the Certificate of majority that owns credited as Federal Deputy in District VII of Cuautitlan Izcalli, with confirmation that the resounding victory scored once concluded the district count, which totaled 70,106 votes.
Later on August 29, 2012, in General Congress Session takes oath as member of the Federal Legislature LXII.
On September 6, 2012 she has her first participation in Tribune to present the position of the PRI during the Sixth Session Analysis Report of President Felipe Calderón Hinojosa, in economic policy.

References

External links 

 

1983 births
Living people
Members of the Chamber of Deputies (Mexico)
Women members of the Chamber of Deputies (Mexico)
Institutional Revolutionary Party politicians
Universidad Iberoamericana alumni
Politicians from the State of Mexico